George Flowers may refer to:

 George Flowers (politician) (1879–1958), Australian politician
 George Flowers (footballer) (1907–1991), English footballer
 George French Flowers (1811–1872), English composer and musical theorist